Throne of Chaos (TOC) were a heavy metal band from Espoo, Finland, active from 1996 to 2005.  

Their early sound, as recorded on their debut album Menace and Prayer, has been described as melodic death metal, having musical characteristics reminiscent of fellow Finns Children of Bodom.

For their second album, Pervertigo, the band migrated to a sound more heavily influenced by thrash and progressive metal. For their final album, the progressive-leaning Loss Angeles, released on InsideOut Music, the band shortened their name from Throne of Chaos to TOC.

Taneli Kiljunen originally performed all vocals before damaging his throat and being unable to sing for an extended period. Because of this, Pervertigo was performed with the help of two session vocalists: Pasi Nykänen, also of Warmen, and Niklas Isfeldt, vocalist with Dream Evil, and Pure X. For Loss Angeles, Tuomas Nieminen was added to the band with Taneli offering occasional bursts of harsh vocals.

Despite the radical evolution of their sound over their decade of existence, as well as favourable reviews for their final album, the band, unable to make commercial headway, called it quits in August 2005.

Discography

Albums
 Menace and Prayer (2000)
 Pervertigo (2002)
 Loss Angeles (2003)

Singles, EPs & demos
 Equilibrium (Demo, 1996)
 Fata Morgana (EP, 1997)
 Truth and Tragedy (Single, 2002)

References

External links
 

Finnish heavy metal musical groups
Century Media Records artists
Musical groups established in 1996
Musical groups disestablished in 2005